This is an incomplete list of alleged sightings of unidentified flying objects or UFOs in Argentina.

12 May 1962 
 On 12 May 1962 three truckmen, Valentino Tomassini, Gauro Tomassini and Humberto Zenobi were travelling on Route 35 from Bahia Blanca to Jacinto Aráuz. At 4,10 they saw an object on the ground in a field next to the road at a distance of 100 metres. The object looked like a railroad car and was illuminated. As their truck came close to it, the object rose up and crossed the road at a height of four metres; its lights went out and from the lower part of it came a reddish flame. At last, the object divided into two parts, which flew off in different directions.

1 December 1965 

 This sighting is called The Adhara Observatory UFO Lunar Transit. It takes place on December 1, 1965 at 8:30 pm, at the private-owner Adhara Observatory in San Miguel, Buenos Aires province. Scientists received several calls concerning strange objects visible on the moon. The staff of the observatory photographed the moon in fixed intervals; after processing, some photos revealed disk shaped objects flying in front of the moon. Some experts think that the UFOs on the photos are probably a fault in the processing of the film.

27 October 1973 
 On October 30 truck driver Dionisio Llanca was admitted to the Municipal Hospital of Bahía Blanca. He claimed that on the night of October 27, he left his uncle's home in Bahia Blanca to travel to Río Gallegos when he stopped to change a tire and became paralyzed by an intense light. According to Llanca, he saw an object in the sky and beings he described as two men and a woman who subjected him to some form of medical testing. Llanca says he briefly awoke hours later approximately 9 kilometers away. The case was investigated by UFO researcher Fabio Zerpa and published on his book El Reino Subterráneo.

9 January 1986 
 There was an alleged UFO landing on Mount Pajarillo, near the city of Capilla del Monte. It was witnessed by an 11-year-old local child named Gabriel Gomez. The day after the sighting, near Cerro Uritorco, a circular footprint appeared on the ground, known as “Huella del Pajarillo”. It is believed that the area was burned in a circular shape due to a UFO landing.

25 December 1988 

 A silver UFO flew over Villa Urquiza, a high density area in the city of Buenos Aires. It is considered the most spectacular UFO incident of Argentina, with more than 7,500 witnesses. The local airport reported an object flying to the west, towards General Paz Avenue seen on the radars on that sunny afternoon.

Notes

External links 
 MUFON - Last 20 UFO Sightings and Pictures

Argentina
Historical events in Argentina